Arsen Khachik Hambardzumyan (born June 30, 1973 in Yerevan) is an Armenian politician.

Biography
He graduated from the Yerevan State University Faculty of History and Postgraduate Course of YSU Chair of Armenian History. Hambardzumyan was a teacher at College after Aram Manukyan in Shushi from September to Novovember 1993, later worked as assistant at YSU Faculty of History (October–December 1995).

In 1998 and 1999, Hambardzumyan was a chief specialist at the Youth Affairs Department of the RA Ministry of Culture, Sport and Youth Affairs. From 1999 to 2005, he was a chief specialist of the NA Armenian Revolutionary Federation faction. In 2005-2008, he worked as Social Protection Sphere Loan Project Coordinator. In June 2008, Arsen Hambardzumyan was appointed RA Minister of Labor and Social Affairs. He was dismissed from office, according to the RA President’s Decree  №: NH-117 –A, made on May 12, 2009.

He is the author of two research works and about 30 newspaper articles. He is one of the founders of the YSU Students' Trade Union, as well as member of the YSU First Students Council Presidency and Chairman of the Foreign Relations Committee. Hambardzumyan has been a member of Armenian Revolutionary Federation since 1992.

References

External links
Arsen Hambardzumyan

1973 births
Living people
Government ministers of Armenia
Labor and Social Affairs ministers of Armenia
Yerevan State University alumni
Politicians from Yerevan